Ziya Yergök (Formerly known as Ziya Bey) was a Ottoman and Turkish Brigadier General who was notable for his service in the First World War and the Turkish War of Independence.

Biography
He was born in 1873 in Aşağımaden. His father was Ahmet Usta, nicknamed Çito, and his mother is Esma Hanım. He moved to Erzurum with his family when he was 6 years old. He lived a poor and half-starved childhood and was orphaned at the age of 12. He transferred to the military high school in Erzurum and attended the Ottoman Military Academy.

He was promoted to the rank of kolağası in 1909 and was appointed to the 7th Division in Erzurum. In 1914, he was appointed to the 83rd Regiment. He participated in the Dersim Operation in 1908. During the First World War, he commanded his troops in the Bergmann Offensive and the Battle of Sarikamish. He was first wounded in the Sarıkamış Operation, and then he was captured after the success of the Russian counterattack. He first stayed in Semipalatinsk, then to the Krasnoyarsk prison camp. He managed to escape from the prison camp in 1920 and returned to Turkey after 6 years of captivity through East Turkestan and Central Asia.

When he returned to Turkey, he served in Kâzım Karabekir's Eastern Army. After the war, he was awarded the Red Stripe of the Medal of Independence. In 1926 he was reassigned to the west. He was appointed to Afyon as the Chairman of the 1st Corps Court of War. He was promoted to the rank of Mirliva on 30 August 1930 and became a Pasha. He retired in 1931.

He was called to duty again in 1939 as part of the Turkish mobilization declared with the start of World War II and became the commander of the Istanbul Military District. In 1942, he was appointed to the Presidency of the Istanbul No. 2 Martial Law Court. He retired from the age limit for the second time on 14 July 1943. He died on June 1, 1949.

II. He was called to duty again in 1939 as part of the mobilization declared with the start of World War II and became the commander of the Istanbul Military District. In 1942, he was appointed to the Presidency of the Istanbul No. 2 Martial Law Court. He retired from the age limit for the second time on 14 July 1943. He died on June 1, 1949.

Memoirs
Yergök wrote all his memoirs from the first years of his military service with 1,800 pages that holds these memories, author  published A Question from Dersim and the Sarikamish Captivity as adaptations of Yergök's memoirs.

Covering his memories of the turbulent period before World War I, it covers his memories from Harbiye to Dersim , starting from the years when he was a colleague with Enver Pasha in Harbiye, to the 31 March Incident and the Dersim rebellion.

In the book titled From Sarıkamış to Captivity gave information on Ziya Yergök's appointment to the 83rd Regiment Command, his capture by the Russians during the Sarıkamış Operation, his memories and observations in cities from Central Asia, East Turkestan, Siberia and Azerbaijan, where he passed while escaping from the Krasnoyarsk prison camp.

References

1873 births
1949 deaths
Ottoman Army generals
Ottoman military personnel of World War I
Ottoman military personnel of the Balkan Wars
Turkish military personnel of the Turkish War of Independence